The 1996 NAPA 500 was the 31st and final stock car race of the 1996 NASCAR Winston Cup Series and the 37th iteration of the event. The race was held on Sunday, November 10, 1996, in Hampton, Georgia at Atlanta Motor Speedway, a  permanent asphalt quad-oval intermediate speedway. The race took the scheduled 328 laps to complete. At race's end, Joe Gibbs Racing driver Bobby Labonte would manage to dominate for a majority of the race to take his fourth career NASCAR Winston Cup Series victory and his only victory of the season. To fill out the top three, Robert Yates Racing driver Dale Jarrett and Hendrick Motorsports driver Jeff Gordon would finish second and third, respectively.

In the process, Hendrick Motorsports driver Terry Labonte, needing an eighth-place finish or better to clinch the championship, would ride to a fifth-place finish, finishing ahead of runnerup Jeff Gordon, Labonte's teammate by 37 points. The championship was Labonte's second and final championship of his career.

Background 

Atlanta Motor Speedway (formerly Atlanta International Raceway) is a 1.522-mile race track in Hampton, Georgia, United States, 20 miles (32 km) south of Atlanta. It has annually hosted NASCAR Winston Cup Series stock car races since its inauguration in 1960.

The venue was bought by Speedway Motorsports in 1990. In 1994, 46 condominiums were built over the northeastern side of the track. In 1997, to standardize the track with Speedway Motorsports' other two intermediate ovals, the entire track was almost completely rebuilt. The project made the track one of the fastest on the NASCAR circuit.

Entry list 

 (R) - denotes rookie driver.

Qualifying 
Qualifying was split into two rounds. The first round was held on Friday, November 8, at 2:30 PM EST. Each driver would have one lap to set a time. During the first round, the top 25 drivers in the round would be guaranteed a starting spot in the race. If a driver was not able to guarantee a spot in the first round, they had the option to scrub their time from the first round and try and run a faster lap time in a second round qualifying run, held on Saturday, November 9, at 11:00 AM EST. As with the first round, each driver would have one lap to set a time. For this specific race, positions 26-38 would be decided on time, and depending on who needed it, a select amount of positions were given to cars who had not otherwise qualified but were high enough in owner's points.

Six drivers would fail to qualify: Derrike Cope, Jeremy Mayfield, Dick Trickle, Kenny Wallace, Ron Barfield Jr., and Kyle Petty.

Full qualifying results

Race results

References 

1996 NASCAR Winston Cup Series
NASCAR races at Atlanta Motor Speedway
November 1996 sports events in the United States
1996 in sports in Georgia (U.S. state)